Misilyah, sometimes spelled Mithilîyeh and Misilîyeh, is a Palestinian village in the northern West Bank, located 14 kilometers south of the city of Jenin. According to the Palestinian Central Bureau of Statistics, the village had a population of 2,252 inhabitants in mid-year 2006. The main agricultural crops cultivated in Misilya are olives, grapes, figs, and vegetables. Roman and Islamic ruins have been found in the village.

Geography
Misilyah is situated in a small plain in the foothills of Jabal Faḳu'ah, or Mount Gilboa. The plain, Marj al-Gharaḳ, also spelled Merj el-Ghǔrǔk, which lacks any natural drainage, was described at the beginning of the 20th century as transforming into a large swamp during the rainy season, only to dry up in summer, when the resulting field was cultivated with grain.

History
C. R. Conder suggested  in the 1880s that Misilyah was ancient Bethulia, but Zertal, 2004, found no archeological evidence supporting this.

Pottery sherds from the late Roman,  Byzantine, early Muslim and Medieval eras have been found here.

Ottoman era
In 1838,  Edward Robinson noted the village when he travelled in the region, as bordering the extremely fertile Marj Sanur. He listed  it as part of the District of Haritheh, north of Nablus.

In 1870,  Victor Guérin noted it, "sitting on the northern slopes of a hill planted with superb olive trees; at the bottom there is a fertile and well-cultivated plain."

In 1882, the PEF's Survey of Western Palestine described Meselieh: "A small village, with a detached portion to the north, and placed on a slope, with a hill to the south, and surrounded by good olive-groves, with an open valley called Wady el Melek (' the King's Valley') on the north. The water-supply is from  wells, some of which have an ancient appearance. They are mainly supplied with rain-water."

British Mandate era
In the 1922 census of Palestine conducted by the British Mandate authorities, Meselayyeh had a population 190 Muslims, increasing  in the 1931 census to 222 Muslim, in  a total of 49 houses.

In the  1945 statistics   the population was 330 Muslims, with a total of 9,038  dunams of land, according to an official land and population survey.  Of this, 2,683  dunams were used for plantations and irrigable land, 2,592  dunams were for cereals, while a total of  23 dunams were built-up, urban land.

Jordanian era
In the wake of the 1948 Arab–Israeli War, and after the 1949 Armistice Agreements, Misilyah came under Jordanian rule.

In 1961, the population of Misilya was 606.

Post-1967
After the Six-Day War in 1967,  Misilyah  has been under Israeli occupation.

On 17 January 2016 a 21 year old resident of Masliya was shot dead by Israeli soldiers.

References

Bibliography

External links
Welcome to Misilya, Palestine remembered
Survey of Western Palestine, Map 11: IAA, Wikimedia commons

Villages in the West Bank
Jenin Governorate
Municipalities of the State of Palestine